Miguel Hidalgo y Costilla Guadalajara International Airport or simply Guadalajara International Airport , is the main airport of Guadalajara, Mexico's third-largest city. Opened in 1966, it is located 16 km south of the city center. In 2021 it handled 12,243,000 passengers, and 15,606,600 in 2021, an increase of 30.6%. It is Latin America's ninth and Mexico's third-busiest airport, after Mexico City International Airport and Cancún International Airport, and second-busiest for cargo flights.

Guadalajara's International Airport consists of two runways and one terminal. A major airport for connections, it became a hub for Volaris and its primary gateway to the United States. It is also a focus city for Aeroméxico and VivaAerobus. Flights are offered to destinations within Mexico and to Central America, the United States and Spain. In addition, cargo flights are offered to many destinations, including countries in Asia and Europe.

The airport is named for Miguel Hidalgo, who began the war that brought Mexican independence from Spain. He has been called the "father of Mexican independence".

History
It was inaugurated on 1 March 1951 by then-president of Mexico, Miguel Alemán Valdés, and the governor of the state of Jalisco, José de Jesús González Gallo.

On May 24, 1993 the airport parking lot was the scene of a deadly firefight between the Logan Heights Gang working for the Tijuana Cartel and the Sinaloa Cartel. Seven people were killed including Catholic Archbishop Juan Jesús Posadas Ocampo.

In 2020, it was announced that the Grupo Aeroportuario del Pacífico group have invested around $14 billion pesos to build a new runway and terminal building, along with new facilities and improvements such as an expanded parking lot, a hotel, office block, and a solar-powered plant. Additionally, the airport aims to expand services to the United States as well as Europe. Expected to be completed by 2024, it is part of GAP's new expansion plan for its airports in the state of Jalisco, both Guadalajara and Puerto Vallarta, and its total budget is $18 billion pesos.

The Guadalajara airport gained a nonstop link to Europe when Aeroméxico introduced flights to Madrid, Spain in December 2021.

Terminals

Passenger terminal
The Passenger Terminal or Terminal 1, is used by all airlines for international and domestic flights. The terminal has customs facilities. There are also 27 remote parking positions. It also has 12 jetways and 4 concourses:

Concourse A - Airside Walk-up gates A1 through A8 
Concourse B - Jetway gates B10 through B13
Concourse C - Jetway gates C30 through C37
Concourse D - Lower level, Bus gates D40 through D50

Cargo terminal
The Cargo Terminal was recently expanded and has a capacity to store approximately 350,000 tons of goods annually in its 27,000 square meters. It has 6 positions that can handle any kind of major aircraft.

Airlines and destinations

Passenger

Cargo

Amenities

Restaurants

 Burger King
 California Pizza Kitchen
 Carl's Jr.
 Chili's
 Corner Bar
 De Volada Grab N' Go
 El Quijote
 Fronteras Bar
 Guacamole Mexican Grill
 Johnny Rockets
 Krispy Kreme
 La Pausa
 Los Tres Amigos Tacos
 Medas
 Natural Break
 Sbarro
 Starbucks
 Subway
 Wings

Car rental
 Avis
 Enterprise
 Hertz
 Veico Car Rental
 City Car Rental
 Mex Rent A Car

Hotels
 City Express Guadalajara Aeropuerto
 Hampton Inn de Hilton Guadalajara-Aeropuerto
 Hangar Inn

VIP Lounges
 Aeroméxico Salón Premier
 Citibanamex Salón Beyond 
 VIP Lounge East
 VIP Lounge West

Statistics

Passengers

Busiest routes

Notes

Local conflicts
Recently, the expansion projects are being delayed due to conflicts with the local residents. Also, several protests were made, blocking the parking lot access many times. These expansion projects include new and better access to the terminal, and it would take 3 years to build a 2nd runway (includes 2 years of land preparation and 1 to build the base and pave it).  The locals argue that Grupo Aeroportuario del Pacífico has debts to the land where the airport sits on because of expropriation of land, which was taken from locals in 1975 to expand the airport. This terrain consists of the airport's polygon plus 320 hectares — of which 51 hectares will be used to build the 2nd runway. Grupo Aeroportuario del Pacífico urged the Secretariat of Communications and Transportation to resolve the problems by delaying the airport's 2nd runway construction. With this new runway and the expansion of the terminal building, the airport will be able to handle over 40 million passengers. If not negotiated the next step could be another expropriation to complete the project.

Accidents and incidents
 On June 2, 1958, Aeronaves de México Flight 111, a Lockheed L-749A Constellation (registration XA-MEV), crashed into La Latilla Mountain, 16 kilometers (10 miles) from the airport, shortly after takeoff for a flight to Mexico City, after the airliner's crew failed to follow the established climb-out procedure for the airport after taking off. The crash killed all 45 people on board, and two prominent American scientists – oceanographer Townsend Cromwell and fisheries scientist Bell M. Shimada – were among the dead. It was the deadliest aviation accident in Mexican history at the time.
 Aeroméxico Flight 498: On August 31, 1986 an Aeroméxico DC-9 that originated from Mexico City and stopped at Guadalajara, Loreto and Tijuana collided with a private aircraft while attempting to land at Los Angeles International Airport.
 On May 24, 1993, Juan Jesús Posadas Ocampo, the Archbishop of Guadalajara, and six other people were killed in a shootout between rival drug cartels in the airport parking lot.
 On September 16, 1998, Continental Flight 475, a Boeing 737-524 registered N20643. Departed Houston at 20:56 for an IFR flight to Guadalajara. After executing a missed approach on their first ILS approach to runway 28, the flight was vectored for a second approach to runway 28. The second approach was reported by both pilots to be uneventful; however, after touchdown, the aircraft drifted to the left side of the runway. The left main landing gear exited the hard surface of the runway approximately 2700 feet from the threshold and eventually, all 3 landing gears exited the 197-foot wide asphalt runway, and all the passengers survived.

See also

List of the busiest airports in Mexico

References

External links

 Grupo Aeroportuario del Pacífico
 AeropuertosMexico.com (in English)
 FlightAware U.S. airport activity to/from: Don Miguel Hidalgo Y Costilla Int'l (MMGL)
 A-Z World Airports: Don Miguel Hidalgo Airport (GDL/MMGL)
 TAR Aerolineas

Airports in Jalisco
Airport